Harry Nestor (born Franz Harry Pridun; 11 March 1893 – 11 November 1969) was an Austrian actor.

Selected filmography
 The Secret of the Mummy (1921)
 The Bull of Olivera (1921)
 To the Ladies' Paradise (1922)
 City in View (1923)
 Everybody's Woman (1924)
 Modern Marriages (1924)
 Curfew (1925)
 The Great Opportunity (1925)
 Boarding House Groonen (1925)
 Orphan of Lowood (1926)
 Our Daily Bread (1926)
 The Pride of the Company (1926)
 Superfluous People (1926)
 Lützow's Wild Hunt (1927)
 Two Under the Stars (1927)
 The Transformation of Dr. Bessel (1927)
 Eddy Polo in the Wasp's Nest (1928)
 A Knight in London (1929)
 The Third Confession (1929)
 On the Reeperbahn at Half Past Midnight (1929)
 The Man with the Frog (1929)
 Ship in Distress (1929)
 The Tender Relatives (1930)
 Nights of Princes (1930)
 The Man in the Dark (1930)
 Two People (1930)
 Three Days of Love (1931)
 Alarm at Midnight (1931)
 The Woman They Talk About (1931)
 In the Name of the Law (1932)
 The Naked Truth (1932)

Bibliography
 Kulik, Karol. Alexander Korda: The Man Who Could Work Miracles. Virgin Books, 1990.

References

External links

1893 births
1969 deaths
Austrian male film actors
Austrian male silent film actors
Male actors from Vienna
20th-century Austrian male actors